Bacotoma ptochura is a moth in the subfamily Spilomelinae of the family Crambidae. It was described by Edward Meyrick in 1894. It is found on Borneo.

References

Spilomelinae
Moths described in 1894